So Help Me God! is the sixth studio album by American rapper 2 Chainz. It was released on November 13, 2020, through T.R.U and Def Jam Recordings. It features guest appearances from Brent Faiyaz, Chief Keef, Kanye West, Kevin Gates, Lil Duval, Lil Uzi Vert, Lil Wayne, Latto, Rick Ross, Skooly, Ty Dolla Sign and YoungBoy Never Broke Again.

Background
In August 2020, following his Verzuz battle with Rick Ross, 2 Chainz announced that his upcoming sixth album would be titled So Help Me God. The album was originally set to be  released on September 25, 2020, but it was delayed due to sample clearance issues.

The lead single, "Money Maker", featuring American rapper Lil Wayne, was released on August 7, 2020. The second single, "Quarantine Thick", featuring American rapper Latto, was released on November 6, 2020.

Track listing
Credits adapted from Tidal.
 

 
Notes
  signifies a co-producer
  signifies an additional producer
 Latto is credited as "Mulatto" on streaming versions of "Quarantine Thick" as a featured artist
 "Save Me" features additional vocals from BJ the Chicago Kid
 "Ziploc" features additional vocals from Desi Banks
 "Southside Hov" features background vocals from Sevyn Streeter
 "Vampire" features additional vocals from James Riley
 "YRB" features additional vocals from Big Rube

Sample Credits
 "Save Me" contains uncredited samples of "I Love You", as performed by Problem featuring BJ the Chicago Kid.
 "Money Maker" contains samples of "Human Jukebox", courtesy of Southern University and A&M College; and a sample from "Piece of My Love", written by Edward Riley, Aaron Hall, Timothy Gatling and Gene Griffin, as performed by Guy.
"Can't Go for That" contains samples of "I Can't Go for That (No Can Do)", written by Sara Allen, Daryl Hall and John Oates, as performed by Hall & Oates.
 "Toni" contains interpolations of "Like a Pimp", written by Lavell Crump, Wesley Weston, Chad Butler, Bernard Freeman and Barry White, as performed by Lil' Flip featuring David Banner, which itself interpolates "Take It Off", written by Butler and Freeman, as performed by UGK.
 "Southside Hov" contains interpolations from "Feelin' It, written by Shawn Carter and David Willis, as performed by Jay-Z featuring Mecca.
 "Wait for You to Die" contains samples of "Early in the Mornin'", written and performed by Alan Lomax.
 "55 Times" contains uncredited dialogue from The Great Dictator, spoken by Charlie Chaplin, courtesy of United Artists.

Charts

References

 

 

2020 albums
2 Chainz albums
Albums produced by TM88
Def Jam Recordings albums
Albums produced by Cool & Dre
Albums produced by Dem Jointz
Albums produced by David Banner
Albums produced by Mike Will Made It
Albums produced by Mike Dean (record producer)